William Patrick Glynn (9 July 1900 – 14 April 1978) was an Australian rules footballer who played with Collingwood in the Victorian Football League (VFL).

Notes

External links 

Bill Glynn's profile at Collingwood Forever

1900 births
1978 deaths
Australian rules footballers from Melbourne
Collingwood Football Club players
People from Fairfield, Victoria